The 2019 ICC Women's Qualifier Europe was a cricket tournament that was held in Spain in June 2019. The matches in the tournament were played as Women's Twenty20 Internationals (WT20Is), with the top team progressing to both the 2019 ICC Women's World Twenty20 Qualifier and the 2021 Women's Cricket World Cup Qualifier tournaments.

In March 2019, Scotland was confirmed as the host nation for the Women's World Twenty20 Qualifier tournament. Therefore, if Scotland won the Europe Qualifier group, the next highest positioned team would also progress to the 2019 ICC Women's World Twenty20 Qualifier tournament. On 31 May 2019, the International Cricket Council (ICC) confirmed all of the squads for the tournament.

On 26 June 2019, in the opening fixture of the tournament, Germany played their first ever WT20I match. The following day, the match between Scotland and the Netherlands ended in a tie, with Scotland winning the Super Over. Ahead of the final day of fixtures, all three teams were still in contention to win the qualifier. On the final day of the qualifier, both Scotland and the Netherlands won their match against Germany. Therefore, the Netherlands won the tournament, after finishing ahead of Scotland on net run rate.

Teams
The following teams competed in the tournament:

Points table

Fixtures

References

External links
 Series home at ESPN Cricinfo

 
 
2019 in women's cricket
International women's cricket competitions in Spain
International cricket competitions in 2019